Hymenopterida is a superorder of insects, comprising Hymenoptera and the orders of Panorpida (Mecoptera, Siphonaptera, Diptera, Trichoptera and Lepidoptera).　The superorder is a member of Endopterygota and most closely related to the orders of Neuropterida and Coleopterida (Coleoptera and Strepsiptera).

Evolution

The cladogram based on a 2008 DNA and protein analysis, shows the internal relationships of the superorder as a clade of Hymenoptera and the orders of Panorpida.

See also

 Hymenoptera Genome Database
 Insects in literature (ant, bee, wasp)
 Worker policing

References

External links

 
Cenozoic insects
Extant Triassic first appearances
Insect superorders
Mesozoic insects
Taxa named by Carl Linnaeus
Triassic insects
Endopterygota